Eela Kokk is an Estonian para swimmer.

At the 1996 Summer Paralympics in Atlanta, she won a silver medal in the Women's 50m freestyle MH (see Swimming at the 1996 Summer Paralympics).

See also
Estonia at the Paralympics

References

Living people

Year of birth missing (living people)
Paralympic swimmers of Estonia
20th-century Estonian people